Tahinopita is a Cypriot cake flavoured with sesame paste. Variations on the recipe include quickbread versions with chemical leaveners (such as baking soda or baking powder), yeasted versions, and phyllo layer versions. As most varieties contain no dairy, eggs, or oil, they are popular during Lent and can be considered vegan.

In the Greek language, where the word pita is a generic word for either bread, cake or pastry, tahinopita refers to a sweet bread roll (see tahini bread roll).

See also
Sweet roll
Fig roll
Cinnamon roll
Pita

Footnotes

Greek desserts
Greek cakes
Turkish desserts
Cakes
Mediterranean cuisine
Middle Eastern cuisine